KPKN-LD (channel 33) is a low-powered television station, licensed to Tyler, Texas, United States, serving East Texas as an affiliate of the Buzzr and Ion Television networks. Owned by DTV America Corporation of Sunrise, Florida, it is an in-market sister station to KDKJ-LD (channel 27), and shares spectrum on RF35 with KCEB (channel 54).

History 
The Federal Communications Commission granted the construction permit for the station, as K33KN-D, on February 25, 2010. The station's call letters were changed to the current KPKN-LD on March 29, 2016. The station signed on in April 2016 as an affiliate of FremantleMedia’s Buzzr network. Buzzr was previously on KDKJ-LD4 until that point. Katz Broadcasting’s male-oriented Grit replaced Buzzr on KDKJ-LD4 upon KPKN’s sign on.

On March 10, 2023, following the announcement of Scripps to combine the True Real and Defy TV networks in to one, KPKN-LD DT2 switched to Ion Television, becoming the area's second affiliate, alongside KETK-TV DT3.

Subchannels

References

External links
DTV America

Buzzr affiliates
PKN-LD
Low-power television stations in the United States
Television channels and stations established in 2016
2016 establishments in Texas
Innovate Corp.